This Fortress World is a science fiction novel by American writer James E. Gunn.  It was published in 1955 by Gnome Press in an edition of 4,000 copies.

Plot summary
The novel concerns a man's fight against the power of a future church.

Sources

External links

1955 American novels
1955 science fiction novels
American science fiction novels